is a railway station in  the city of Shirakawa, Fukushima, Japan, operated by East Japan Railway Company (JR East).

Lines
Shirakawa Station is served by the Tōhoku Main Line, and is located 188.2 rail kilometers from the official starting point of the line at Tokyo Station.

Station layout
The station has one island platform connected to the station building by a footbridge. The station has a "Midori no Madoguchi" staffed ticket office.

Platforms

History
Shirakawa Station opened on July 16, 1887. The Hakuhō Line connecting Shirakawa with  operated from this station from 1916-1944. The station was absorbed into the JR East network upon the privatization of the Japanese National Railways (JNR) on April 1, 1987.

Passenger statistics
In fiscal 2018, the station was used by an average of 624 passengers daily (boarding passengers only).

Surrounding area
 Shirakawa City Hall
 Shirakawa Post Office
 Shiroyama Park

See also
 List of Railway Stations in Japan

References

External links

  

Stations of East Japan Railway Company
Railway stations in Fukushima Prefecture
Tōhoku Main Line
Railway stations in Japan opened in 1887
Shirakawa, Fukushima